The 1971–72 season was Mansfield Town's 35th season in the Football League and 11th in the Third Division, they finished in 21st position with 36 points and were relegated to the Fourth Division on goal average.

Final league table

Results

Football League Third Division

FA Cup

League Cup

Squad statistics
 Squad list sourced from

References
General
 Mansfield Town 1971–72 at soccerbase.com (use drop down list to select relevant season)

Specific

Mansfield Town F.C. seasons
Mansfield Town